The Ehle is a river in Saxony-Anhalt, Germany.

See also 
List of rivers of Saxony-Anhalt

Rivers of Saxony-Anhalt
Rivers of Germany